The Barcarolle in F-sharp major, Op. 60, is a piece for solo piano by Frédéric Chopin, composed between autumn of 1845 and summer 1846, three years before his death.

Based on the barcarolle rhythm and mood, it features a sweepingly romantic and slightly wistful tone. Many of the technical figures for the right hand are thirds and sixths, while the left features very long reaches over an octave. Its middle section is in A major, and this section's second theme is recapitulated near the piece's end in F-sharp.  It is also one of the pieces where Chopin's affinity to the bel canto operatic style is most apparent, as the double notes in the right hand along with spare arpeggiated accompaniment in the left hand explicitly imitates the style of the great arias and scenas from the bel canto operatic repertoire.   The writing for the right hand becomes increasingly florid as multiple lines spin filigree and ornamentation around each other.

This is one of Chopin's last major compositions, along with his Polonaise-Fantasie, Op. 61. It is often considered to be one of his more demanding compositions, both in execution and interpretation, and recordings exist by virtually all the greatest pianists. Performance times average seven to nine minutes.

External links 
 Work details and audio, The Chopin Project
 

Compositions by Frédéric Chopin
Compositions for solo piano
1846 compositions
Compositions in F-sharp major